In Greek mythology, Tantalus (Ancient Greek: Τάνταλος Tántalos) was a prince of south of Argolis as son of King Thyestes. He was the brother of Pleisthenes.  An alternative genealogy makes him the son of Broteas.

Tantalus and Pleisthenes were killed in revenge by their uncle Atreus, their father’s brother, after Thyestes seduced Aerope, wife of Atreus. The latter was a king of Mycenae.

In some accounts, Tantalus was the first husband of Clytemnestra. He was slain together with their newborn child by Agamemnon who married the Spartan princess after his death.

See also
 Aegisthus
 Orestes

Note

References 
 Gods and Heroes, Gustav Schwab, Pantheon
Tzetzes, John, Book of Histories, Book I translated by Ana Untila from the original Greek of T. Kiessling's edition of 1826. Online version at theio.com

Princes in Greek mythology